Danny Choi, better known by his stage name Ghost Loft, is an American recording artist, record producer, and songwriter based in Los Angeles.

His genres include electronic music and R&B. He has remixed tracks from artists such as Two Door Cinema Club and The Neighbourhood.

Career
Ghost Loft's debut single "Seconds" received widespread blog coverage throughout 2012–2013, and has been played on UK national radio by DJs including Annie Mac. "Seconds" was also added to Triple J rotation, after being selected as "Catch of the Day" by radio host Zan Rowe.

In 2013, Ghost Loft's "So High" was released on the compilation Kitsuné AMERICA 2 by French record label Kitsuné. Ghost Loft is featured on a Wiz Khalifa version of "So High" on the rapper's 2014 album, Blacc Hollywood.

In 2016, Ghost Loft produced the opening music for Justin Bieber's Purpose World Tour.

On 23 May 2018, Chicago rapper Juice Wrld released his debut album, Goodbye & Good Riddance. Juice Wrld's track titled "Scared of Love" contained a sample of Ghost Loft's "So High".

Awards and nominations

Discography

Singles
 "Seconds" (2013)
 "So High" (2013)
 "Be Easy" (2014)
 "Talk to Me" (2014)
 "Overflow" (2015)
 "The Otherside" (2015)
 "Barely Breathing" (2016)
 "Holding On" (2017)
 "Burn Slow" (2017)
 "End of the Light" (2018)
 "Bless Up" (2018)

Featured In
 "So High" (Wiz Khalifa featuring Ghost Loft) (2014)
 "The Last  (Wiz Khalifa featuring Ghost Loft) (2014)

Productions
 "So High" (Wiz Khalifa featuring Ghost Loft) (2014)
 Gilbere Forte – "Fall For Nothing (feat. Nylo)" from PRAY (2013)

Remixes
 jj – "Beautiful Life" (2012)
 Icky Blossoms – "Heat Lightning" (2012)
 Louis Brennan – "The Towpath" (2012)
 The Neighbourhood – "Let It Go" (2013)
 Little Daylight – "Overdose" (2013)
 The High Wire – "Lnoe" (2013)
 Two Door Cinema Club – "Handshake" (2013)
 Joel Compass – "Astronaut" (2013)
 RÁJ – "Ghost" (2013)
 Ryn Weaver – "Octahate" (2014)
 Janine – "Hold Me" (2015)
 MICHL – "When You Loved Me Least" (2016)
 R3hab – "Icarus" (2016)

Appearances
 Kitsuné America 2 – "So High" (CD, 2013 Kitsuné Music)
 Blacc Hollywood – "Wiz Khalifa - So High" (CD, 2014 Atlantic Records)

References

Living people
American electronic musicians
Musicians from Los Angeles
Ableton Live users
Year of birth missing (living people)